Inger Sandlie (born 8 June 1953) is a Norwegian molecular biologist.

She took her dr.philos. degree in biochemistry at the University of Bergen, and was a post-doctoral fellow at the Johns Hopkins University. She was hired at the University of Oslo in 1988, and is now a professor at the Section for Biochemistry and Molecular Biology. She is a fellow of the Norwegian Academy of Science and Letters.

She resides at Røa.

References

1953 births
Living people
University of Bergen alumni
Norwegian expatriates in the United States
Academic staff of the University of Oslo
Norwegian molecular biologists
Members of the Norwegian Academy of Science and Letters